America, I Hear You Singing is an album recorded and released in 1964 by American singers Frank Sinatra and Bing Crosby, backed by Fred Waring's Pennsylvanians. The album is a collection of patriotic songs, recorded as a tribute to the assassinated president John F. Kennedy.  The artists would collaborate again for the album 12 Songs of Christmas, released later the same year.

An abridged version of the album was reissued as This Land Is Your Land (H 30931) on Columbia's budget label Harmony in 1971. The album received its first release on CD in 2010. The tracks featuring Frank Sinatra were included on the 1995 box set The Complete Reprise Studio Recordings.

Sinatra's daughter, Nancy Sinatra, said the album reflected her father's deepest beliefs. "I love my father's patriotism," she wrote. "I love the fact that he is so open and honest about his feelings for and about our nation. This beautiful album is an example of his deep love and respect for the U.S.A."

Reception
A critic at Variety magazine liked the album, commenting, "This is an impressive gathering of top names for a patriotic paean in a swinging format. Backed by Fred Waring's orchestra and chorus, Bing Crosby and Frank Sinatra singly and in tandem deliver a fine collection of flag-wavers."

The album first appeared on the Billboard Top LPs chart in the issue of May 30, 1964, ranked at No. 130. It was still on the chart seven weeks later, ranked at No. 125.

Track listing
All tracks feature Fred Waring and the Pennsylvanians.

Personnel
 Frank Sinatra – vocals
 Bing Crosby – vocals
 Fred Waring and the Pennsylvanians – vocals

References

1964 albums
Albums produced by Sonny Burke
Frank Sinatra albums
Bing Crosby albums
Fred Waring albums
Reprise Records albums
Concept albums